Tommy Ice Cream Heaven Forever is the fifth studio album by Tommy heavenly.6 It was released on November 27, 2013. The album's first single, "Ruby Eyes", was released on October 2, 2013. Tommy Ice Cream Heaven Forever is the heavenly6 counterpart to February6's Tommy Candy Shop Sugar Me.

Release and promotion
In August 2013, Tommy announced she would be releasing a new single on October 2, 2013 that would be used as the theme for drama Kiyoku Ranman, and that the new single would be included in a new album to be released October 2013.
The single's title was later revealed to be "Ruby Eyes". The title of the album was revealed to be Tommy ♥ Ice Cream Heaven ♥ Forever along with an announcement that the release date was to be on October 23, 2013. Later, the release date of the album was pushed back to November 27, 2013.
"Ruby Eyes" was released as a digital single on October 2, 2013, with the music video debuting on the Warner Music Japan official YouTube account on October 25, 2013.

Track listing
The official track listing was posted to the Warner Music Japan site on November 1, 2013.

Personnel
 Tomoko Kawase – Vocals
 Chiffon Brownie

Charts

References

External links
 Tommy heavenly6 official website
 Tommy heavenly6 discography

2013 albums
Tomoko Kawase albums